Mount Hope is a city in Fayette County, West Virginia, United States. The population was 1,414 at the 2010 census.

History
The community took its name from the local Mount Hope School.

The Mount Hope Historic District and New River Company General Office Building are listed on the National Register of Historic Places.

Geography
Mount Hope is located at  (37.892595, -81.167687).

The Summit
A parcel of land, totaling  of property known locally as Garden Ground was donated by the Bechtel Foundation to the Boy Scouts of America for development into The Summit: Bechtel Family National Scout Reserve, a high adventure base and site for the national Scout jamboree.

Demographics

2010 census
As of the census of 2010, there were 1,414 people, 626 households, and 362 families living in the city. The racial makeup of the city was 77.0% White, 18.0% African American, 0.5% Native American, 0.4% Asian, 0.4% from other races, and 3.7% from two or more races. Hispanic or Latino of any race were 1.6% of the population.

There were 626 households, of which 30.0% had children under the age of 18 living with them, 34.7% were married couples living together, 16.8% had a female householder with no husband present, 6.4% had a male householder with no wife present, and 42.2% were non-families. 37.1% of all households were made up of individuals, and 12% had someone living alone who was 65 years of age or older. The average household size was 2.26 and the average family size was 2.95.

The median age in the city was 37.5 years. 24.8% of residents were under the age of 18; 9.1% were between the ages of 18 and 24; 25.4% were from 25 to 44; 26.1% were from 45 to 64; and 14.6% were 65 years of age or older. The gender makeup of the city was 47.6% male and 52.4% female.

2000 census
As of the census of 2000, there were 1,487 people, 635 households, and 419 families living in the city. The population density was 1,142.9 people per square mile (441.6/km2). There were 750 housing units at an average density of 576.4 per square mile (222.8/km2). The racial makeup of the city was 73.77% White, 22.33% African American, 0.34% Native American, 0.07% Asian, 0.27% Pacific Islander, 0.94% from other races, and 2.29% from two or more races. Hispanic or Latino of any race were 1.41% of the population.

There were 635 households, out of which 31.0% had children under the age of 18 living with them, 38.1% were married couples living together, 23.9% had a female householder with no husband present, and 34.0% were non-families. 30.2% of all households were made up of individuals, and 15.9% had someone living alone who was 65 years of age or older. The average household size was 2.34 and the average family size was 2.87.

In the city, the population was spread out, with 27.2% under the age of 18, 8.5% from 18 to 24, 24.6% from 25 to 44, 23.7% from 45 to 64, and 16.0% who were 65 years of age or older. The median age was 37 years. For every 100 females, there were 82.2 males. For every 100 females age 18 and over, there were 76.2 males.

The median income for a household in the city was $18,375, and the median income for a family was $23,333. Males had a median income of $25,833 versus $16,500 for females. The per capita income for the city was $11,147. About 35.1% of families and 36.0% of the population were below the poverty line, including 57.3% of those under age 18 and 7.1% of those age 65 or over.

Notable people
 Bob Elkins - Character actor
 John Edward McClung - Old-time musician born here.
 Lonnie Warwick- NFL Linebacker, Minnesota Vikings, Atlanta Falcons, Washington Redskins

References

Cities in West Virginia
Cities in Fayette County, West Virginia